The United Press International College Football Player of the Year Award was among the first and most recognized college football awards. With the second bankruptcy of UPI in 1991, along with that of its parent company, the award was discontinued. Offensive and defensive players were eligible. Unlike the Heisman, it was never affiliated with a civic organization or named after a player (like the Walter Camp Award). Like all UPI college awards at the time, it was based on the votes of NCAA coaches. Billy Cannon, O.J. Simpson, and Archie Griffin are the only two-time winners.

Winners

References

College football national player awards